Avant-garde refers to a style in experimental work in art, music, culture, or politics.

Avant-garde may also refer to:

 Avant-Garde (magazine), a graphic design magazine
 ITC Avant Garde, a typeface
 Avant-Garde Computing, a defunct networking software company
 Avant-Garde, youth section of the French Milice paramilitary organization
 Zaila Avant-garde, winner of 2021 93rd Scripps National Spelling Bee

Music
 Avant-garde music
 Avant-garde jazz
 The Avant-Garde (album), an album by John Coltrane and Don Cherry
 The Avant-Garde, a 1960s American pop group
 Avant Garde (band), a 1980s American progressive metal band
 Avantgarde (band), a 2000s Spanish indie rock band
 Avant-garde metal, a subgenre of heavy metal music
 Avantgarde Music, an Italian record label

See also
 Avant-pop
 Lists of avant-garde films